
Nowy Tomyśl County is a unit of territorial administration and local government (powiat) in Greater Poland Voivodeship, west-central Poland. It came into being on January 1, 1999, as a result of the Polish local government reforms passed in 1998.

As of 2006 its total population is 71,817, out of which the population of Nowy Tomyśl is 15,225, that of Opalenica is 9,104, that of Zbąszyń is 7,300, that of Lwówek is 2,909, and the rural population is 37,279.

Neighbouring counties
Nowy Tomyśl County is bordered by Międzychód County to the north, Szamotuły County to the north-east, Poznań County and Grodzisk Wielkopolski County to the east, Wolsztyn County to the south, Zielona Góra County to the south-west, and Świebodzin County and Międzyrzecz County to the west.

Administrative division
The county is subdivided into six gminas (four urban-rural and two rural). These are listed in the following table, in descending order of population.

References
Polish official population figures 2006

 
Land counties of Greater Poland Voivodeship